Orcas Island Airport  is a public airport located  north of the central business district of Eastsound on Orcas Island in San Juan County, Washington, United States.

ORS has been assigned to Orpheus Island Resort Waterport in Queensland, Australia.

It is included in the Federal Aviation Administration (FAA) National Plan of Integrated Airport Systems for 2017–2021, in which it is categorized as a non-primary commercial service facility.

Facilities and aircraft 

In 2014, the airport had 41,800 aircraft operations, an average of 114 per day: 79% general aviation, 16% commercial, and 5% air taxi.

Airlines and destinations

References

External links 
 Orcas Island Airport at WSDOT Aviation

Airports in Washington (state)
Airports in San Juan County, Washington